{|

{{Infobox ship characteristics
|Hide header=
|Header caption=
|Ship class=
|Ship tonnage=1721 gross tons
|Ship displacement=
|Ship length=
|Ship beam=
|Ship height=
|Ship draught=
|Ship draft=
|Ship depth=23.9 ft
|Ship decks=2
|Ship ice class=
|Ship sail plan=Full-rigged ship
|Ship power=
|Ship propulsion=Sail
|Ship speed=
|Ship capacity=
|Ship crew=
|Ship notes=Specifications from Glooscap 1914 Registry Form She circled the world in her first year of operation, carrying freight to Liverpool, Cape Town, Australia, and New York City. She made frequent subsequent voyages to the Pacific. Although built in the twilight period of the Age of Sail, Glooscap earned good profits for her owners shipping freight around the world for two decades under the command of two noted captains, the brothers George T. Spicer and Dewis Spicer of Spencers Island. Glooscap was converted to a gypsum barge in 1914. The ship is featured in exhibits at the lighthouse museum in Spencer's Island and at the Age of Sail Heritage Centre in Port Greville.

References

Sailing Ships of the Maritime Charles Armour and Thomas Lackey (Toronto: McGraw-Hill Ryerson, 1975)

External links
Photograph of Glooscap awaiting launch at Spencers Island in 1891
Virtual Collection of photographs and documents about the ship Glooscap at the Nova Scotia Archives and Records Management

Maritime history of Canada
Transport in Cumberland County, Nova Scotia
Tall ships of Canada
Individual sailing vessels
Ships built in Nova Scotia
Victorian-era merchant ships of Canada
Sailing ships of Canada
1891 ships
Full-rigged ships